A statue of Abraham Lincoln is installed in the Kentucky State Capitol, in Frankfort, Kentucky, United States. The fourteen foot tall statue is cast bronze by sculptor Adolph A. Weinman in 1909 installed on a marble base.

See also
 List of sculptures of presidents of the United States
 List of statues of Abraham Lincoln

References

External links
 
 More photos

1909 establishments in Kentucky
1909 sculptures
Bronze sculptures in Kentucky
Buildings and structures in Frankfort, Kentucky
Marble sculptures in Kentucky
Monuments and memorials in Kentucky
Monuments and memorials to Abraham Lincoln in the United States
Sculptures of men in Kentucky
Statues in Kentucky
Statues of Abraham Lincoln